Oscar Jonsson (born 24 January 1997) is a Swedish footballer who plays for GIF Sundsvall as a goalkeeper.

Career
In 2016 Jonsson was loaned out to Swedish fourth-tier team Håbo FF. In 2017, he went on a loan to third-tier team Enskede IK.

On 22 January 2019, Jonsson signed a two-year contract with Karlstad BK.

On 18 January 2021, Jonsson joined GIF Sundsvall on a three-year deal.

International career
Jonsson has represented the Sweden U17 and Sweden U19.

References

External links 
 

1997 births
Living people
Association football goalkeepers
Swedish footballers
Sweden youth international footballers
Allsvenskan players
Superettan players
Ettan Fotboll players
Djurgårdens IF Fotboll players
Enskede IK players
IK Frej players
Karlstad BK players
GIF Sundsvall players
People from Härjedalen Municipality
Sportspeople from Jämtland County
IF Karlstad Fotboll players